Terence James (Terry) Sargeant (born 19 May 1946) is a Canadian former politician and administrator. Sargeant served as a New Democratic Party member of the House of Commons of Canada. Born in Melbourne, Australia, Sargeant was a public policy consultant, personnel administrator and office manager by career. He holds a B.A. and an LL.B. from the University of Manitoba. On 2 June 2011, he was awarded an LL.D. (honoris causa) from the University of Manitoba.

He represented the Manitoba riding of Selkirk—Interlake at which he was elected in 1979 and re-elected in the 1980 federal election. Sargeant left national politics after his defeat in the 1984 election to Felix Holtmann of the Progressive Conservative party. Sargeant served in the 31st and 32nd Canadian Parliaments. In 1988, he sought to replace Howard Pawley as the MLA for Selkirk in the general election that year but was defeated by Liberal Candidate Gwen Charles by 184 votes.

Sargeant was the Chair of the Manitoba Clean Environment Commission.  He also served as Chair of the Board of Governors of the University of Manitoba and Chair of the Board of the Winnipeg Folk Festival.

References

External links
 

1946 births
Living people
Australian expatriates in Canada
Members of the House of Commons of Canada from Manitoba
New Democratic Party MPs
Politicians from Melbourne
University of Manitoba alumni